Three-time defending champion Shingo Kunieda defeated Stéphane Houdet in the final, 3–6, 6–1, 6–0 to win the men's singles wheelchair tennis title at the 2011 US Open. It was his fourth US Open singles title and 13th major singles title overall.

Seeds

Draw

Finals

External links 
 Main Draw

 
 

2011 US Open (tennis)